Dozier-Libbey Medical High School is a public school located in Antioch, California, with a focus on health and medicine. The school is named for Dr. Thomas (Tom) Dozier and Dr. Joseph H. (Joe) Libbey, 2 local physicians who practiced in the area from the 1930s through the late 1980s.

With English and science test scores that are above the state average, this school has earned awards such as the California Gold Ribbon Award and has been recognized as one of the best high schools in the U.S. by U.S. News & World Report. The school's mission statement reads, "DLMHS exists to challenge students with exciting rigorous instruction that prepares them with the knowledge and experience to succeed in health science professions and college."

References

High schools in Contra Costa County, California
Antioch, California
Public high schools in California
2007 establishments in California